Anadi Charan Das was an Indian politician. He was elected to the Lok Sabha, the lower house of the Parliament of India from the Jajpur constituency of Odisha in 1971, 1980 and 1984 as a member of the Indian National Congress and in 1989 and 1991 as a member of the Janata Dal but rejoined the Indian National Congress in controversial circumstances which helped save Narasimha Rao Government on 28 July 1993 no confidence vote along with a group led by Ram Lakhan Singh Yadav.

References

External links
 Official biographical sketch in Parliament of India website

1935 births
Janata Dal politicians
Lok Sabha members from Odisha
India MPs 1971–1977
India MPs 1980–1984
India MPs 1984–1989
India MPs 1989–1991
India MPs 1991–1996
Living people
People from Jajpur district
Indian National Congress politicians
Indian National Congress politicians from Odisha